Friedrich Georg Hendel (14 December 1874- 26 June 1936) was an Austrian high school director and entomologist mainly interested in Diptera. He described very many new species and made important contributions to the higher taxonomy of the Diptera.

He was born in Vienna and died in Baden bei Wien. His collection is in the Vienna Natural History Museum.

Works

Selection 1908-1914

1908 Nouvelle classification des mouches à deux ailes (Diptera L.), d’après un plan tout nouveau par J. G. Meigen, Paris, an VIII (1800 v.s.). Mit einem Kommentar. Verh. Zool.-Bot. Ges.Wien 58: 43-69. 
1910 Über die Nomenklatur der Acalyptratengattungen nach Th. Beckers Katalog der paläarktischen Dipteren, Bd. 4. Wien. Ent. Ztg. 29: 307-313. 
1914  Diptera. Fam. Muscaridae, Subfam. Platystominae. Genera Ins. 157, 179 pp., 15 pls.
1914 Die Arten der Platystominen. Abh. Zool.-Bot. Ges. Wien 8 (1): 1-409, 4 pls.
1914 Die Bohrfliegen Südamerikas. Abh. Ber. K. Zool. Anthrop.-Ethn. Mus. Dresden (1912) 14 (3): 1-84, 4 pls..

Other works see the reference section in Sabrosky's Family Group Names in Diptera

References 

1874 births
1936 deaths
Scientists from Vienna
Austrian entomologists
Dipterists
Austro-Hungarian scientists